Selo gori, a baba se češlja (English: The village is burning, and the grandmother is combing her hair) is a television series in Serbia. First aired in 2007, the show quickly gained national fame with episodes in its third season averaging approximately 2.9 million viewers. The show was aired on RTS1.

Although the end of the series was announced in the closing credits of the episode #89, 12 additional episodes were filmed in 2016, and aired on RTS1 in 2016.

Overview

Premise
The show revolves around the character of Radašin. The entire story is based around his recount of the time when he lived in the village and how he spent his time with his fellow countrymen and women. He recounts his life to his family. Most of the show revolves around Radašin’s family but also around his friends, who are the main characters of the show: Dragojlo, Đota, Milo and sin Dragan.

Plot points
The series is based in a small fictional village near the region where South and West Morava rivers form Great Morava. It is essentially a comedy but it displays a deep emotional connection between family, tradition and the land. The village life is at the heart of the show, often displaying how life is changing in Serbian villages and how these rural communities are quickly disappearing due to the exodus of young people from the country to the city.

The show emphasises that the village is the heart of Serbian culture and pride, a place where humanity has outlasted many challenges. The show further emphasises the finest qualities of the Serbian people such as honesty and kindness and aims to break down the tarnished stereotypical view of Serbian people crafted during the 1990s.

Breast cancer awareness
The show was largely praised for its breast cancer awareness campaign. During season three, one of the main characters of the show, Radojka, is diagnosed with breast cancer. The storyline was based around the director's own experience with breast cancer when his wife was diagnosed. The breast cancer storyline led to an extreme increase in the number of breast cancer screenings in regional parts of Serbia. Shortly after the storyline, a mobile mammography van was deployed to various villages across the country so women could be screened.

Production
The first season of "Selo gori, a baba se češlja" began airing on March 10, 2007 on RTS1. The first season had only 4 episodes which were immensely popular mostly due to the famous cast which took part in the series. The first episode was watched by 2.1 million people, an extremely high figure for a debuting show. However, by the time series 2 began airing (on January 19, 2008), the show recorded massive viewer ratings. The second season contained a total of 25 episodes. The much anticipated third season of the show was aired from December 2008 to a massive television audience. The second episode of the third season was watched by over 3 million people making it one of the most watched programmes ever broadcast in Serbia. Ratings somewhat declined by the end of the third season (mostly due to the beginning of summer when television ratings generally fall) but they still remained strong with average viewing of 2.9 million people, which is extremely high for Serbian television.

"Selo gori, a baba se češlja" is aired once per week. Despite its impressive ratings, which has allowed it to carry the title of the most watched scripted television show in Serbia, the director and screenwriter Radoš Bajić announced that the show's fourth season will be its last. The fourth season was filmed from August 20, 2009 to April 2010, while the show aired from January 16, 2010. It has 33 episodes. The fourth and final season is made up of 2 parts, with the first part airing from January 2010 until May 2010 and the second airing from November 2010 until May 2011.

By the end of the third season "Selo gori, a baba se češlja" has 55 episodes plus 1 special episode which was aired prior to the beginning of the third season, showing the making of the series as well exclusive interviews with the cast and crew.

The show is mostly filmed in Kragujevac and Central Serbia, also known as Šumadija.

Cast

Ratings
"Selo gori, a baba se češlja" is the most watched scripted drama on Serbian television.  Its third season’s fourth episode was the most watched with 3.014.000 viewers, setting a viewership record in Serbian broadcasting television. The average rating of an episode is 34% or 2.9 million viewers. The show has an average share of 68%.

Seasonal rankings (based on average total viewers per episode) of Selo gori, a baba se češlja  on RTS1:

Note: All ratings are based on the AGB Nielsen Media Research

International broadcast
The show is aired in Montenegro, Bosnia and Herzegovina, North Macedonia and Croatia. Slovenia has bought rights to produce a local version of the show. Entitled "Naj ti krava crkne", the show will premier in 2011. It will have 30 episodes.

Awards

2008
 Best couple in a television series: Radoš Bajić and  Ljiljana Stjepanović
 Best television show of 2008
 Oskar Popularnosti Award for most watched television show of 2008

2009
 Manager of the year in television or film production: Radoš Bajić
 Best television creation:  Radoš Bajić
 Best actor in a supporting role: Mirko Babić

Movie
In 2009, a movie was released based on the show. Entitled ”Selo gori ... i tako” (The village is burning ... and so on). The entire cast from the show appeared in the film which was mostly based on the series third season. Internationally, the film will be shown for the first time at the 2010 Serbian Film Festival in Australia in October 2010.

References

External links
 Selo gori, a baba se češlja
 

Radio Television of Serbia original programming
2007 Serbian television series debuts
2011 Serbian television series endings
Serbian drama television series
Serbian comedy television series
Serbian-language television shows
Television shows set in Serbia
Television shows filmed in Serbia